Jakorian Bennett (born August 23, 2000) is an American football corner back for the Maryland Terrapins.

Early life and high school career
Bennett attended McGill-Toolen Catholic High School in Mobile, Alabama and played corner back on the football team. He was a three-star recruit.

College career

Hutchinson Community College 
Bennett played at Hutchinson Community College for two seasons, recording 25 tackles, three interceptions and three tackles for loss. In 2019, he earned first-team All-Kansas Jayhawk Community College Conference honors.

Maryland 
On December 17, 2019, Bennett committed to Maryland.

In his first season with the Terps, he played in four games and recorded six tackles, two pass break ups, and one sack. In the 2021 season, he played in all but one game, missing only the Ohio State gam due to injury.) He lead all power five players with 16 pass break ups (most since Domonique Foxworth), lead the team in interceptions with three, and 24 tackles (23 solo). In the 2022 season opener, Bennett has five pass breakups against Buffalo (most since Tino Ellis). At the end of the season, he would have 27 pass breakups (Most in the Nation), one blocked field goal and one sack.

On December 5, 2022, Bennett declared for the 2023 NFL Draft.

References

Living people
2000 births
American football cornerbacks
Hutchinson Blue Dragons football players
Maryland Terrapins football players
Players of American football from Alabama
Sportspeople from Mobile, Alabama